Erhard "Sepp" Wunderlich (14 December 1956 – 4 October 2012) was a German handball player.

Wunderlich was born in Augsburg.  As a member of the West German handball team, he won the 1978 World Men's Handball Championship and the silver medal at the 1984 Summer Olympics. At the latter tournament he played all six matches and scored 22 goals.

He played club handball for the VfL Gummersbach from 1976 to 1983 when he left to join FC Barcelona. He later returned to Germany to play for the TSV Milbertshofen. During his club career he won four European Cups and two German Championships. In 1999 he was voted German Handballer of the Century.

He died, aged 55, in Cologne of skin cancer. He was buried in his home town Augsburg, as was his last wish, on 10 October 2012.

References

External links
 

1956 births
2012 deaths
German male handball players
German expatriate sportspeople in Spain
FC Barcelona Handbol players
Handball players at the 1984 Summer Olympics
Olympic handball players of West Germany
Olympic silver medalists for West Germany
Olympic medalists in handball
Sportspeople from Augsburg
Medalists at the 1984 Summer Olympics